The 1925 Montana State Bobcats football team represented Montana State College (later renamed Montana State University) in the Rocky Mountain Conference (RMC) during the 1925 college football season. In its fourth season under head coach G. Ott Romney, the team compiled a 6–5 record (1–4 against RMC opponents) and outscored opponents by a total of 291 to 84.

Vander Dobeus, from Lewistown, Montana, was the team captain.

Schedule

References

Montana State
Montana State Bobcats football seasons
Montana State Bobcats football